Lake Gistova, also known as Lake Gkistova, is an alpine lake on the Albania-Greece border. It is the highest lake in Greece. The nearest village is Gramos in Greece. The last years the lake through social media and websites took more attention and more people come to visit it.

References

Gistova
Landforms of Kastoria (regional unit)
Landforms of Western Macedonia
Albania–Greece border
Lakes of Albania